The Rome Quadriennale (Italian: Quadriennale di Roma, also called in English the Rome Quadrennial) is a foundation for the promotion of contemporary Italian art.

Its name derives from the four-yearly exhibitions it is required to host by its constitution. It is based in Rome in the monumental complex of Villa Carpegna.

Exhibitions
All the Rome Quadriennale main exhibitions held at its historical site, the Palazzo delle Esposizioni of Rome, except where indicated.

I Quadriennale, January - June 1931.
II Quadriennale, February - July 1935.
III Quadriennale, February - July 1939.
IV Quadriennale, May - July 1943.
V Quadriennale, March - May 1948.
VI Quadriennale, December 1951 - April 1952.
VII Quadriennale, November 1955 - 1956.
VIII Quadriennale, December 1959 - April 1960.
IX Quadriennale, October 1965 - March 1966.
X Quadriennale, Five exhibitions:
 November - December 1972.
 February - March 1973.
 May - June 1973.
 March - April 1975.
 June - July 1977.
XI Quadriennale, Palazzo dei Congressi, EUR complex, Rome, May - August 1986.  
XII Quadriennale, two exhibitions:
 July - September 1992.
 Palazzo delle Esposizioni and the Ala Mazzoniana of the Roma Termini railway station, September - November 1996.
1999. XIII Quadriennale, Palazzo delle Esposizioni, June - September 1999.
XIV Quadriennale three exhibitions:
 Palazzo Reale, Naples, November 2003 - January 2004.
 Palazzo della Promotrice delle Belle Arti, Turin, January - March 2004.
 Galleria Nazionale d'Arte Moderna, Rome, March - May 2005.
XV Quadriennale, June - September 2008.

See also
Venice Biennale
Rome Film Festival
Cento Pittori via Margutta

Notes and references

External links
Fondazione La Quadriennale di Roma Official  Website

Arts organisations based in Italy
Arts foundations based in Europe
Art exhibitions in Italy
Contemporary art exhibitions
Festivals in Rome
Italian contemporary art
Organisations based in Rome
Quadrennial events